Rosa Vierben del Pilar Marina Incháustegui Anaya (born 2 October 1945), known as Regina Torné, is a Mexican actress, singer and television presenter.

Telenovelas and series 

2014 - Siempre Tuya Acapulco - Soraya Patiño
2011 - Cielo Rojo - Loreto Encinas 
2010 - La Loba - Prudencia Gutiérrez viuda de Alcázar
2009 - Nikte - Diosa Luna / Meztli
2008 - Helena's Cry
2007 - La Niñera - Miss Emilia
2004 - Belinda - Eloísa Fuenmayor
2002 - Por tí - Francisca
2002 - Lo que callamos las mujeres - Doña Cruz
2001 - Como en el cine - Romualda
2000 - El Amor no es como lo pintan - Engracia Valdés de Galán
1999 - Catalina y Sebastián - Antonieta
1998 - La Chacala - Consuelo
1998 - Chiquititas - Soraya Rocche
1997 - Rivales por accidente - Viviana
1995 - Retrato de família - Miriam
1994 - Caminos Cruzados - Katy
1994 - Agujetas de color de rosa - Sabrina
1993 - Clarisa - Doña Beatriz de Bracho Sanabria
1988 - Camara infraganti - Lilian Moreno
1982 - Chispita - Sarah Lovato
1979 - El Chavo del Ocho - Glória
1978 - Rosalia - Aurora
1968 - I Spy - Elena (episode "Turnabout For Traitors")

Films 
2009 - Mi vida por ti - Diana San Román
1996 - Simple mortal - Liliana
1992 - Como água para chocolate - Mamá Elena
1992 - Tu puedes, si quieres - Coñi
1977 - Capulina Chisme Caliente - Geraldine
1976 - Tiempo y destiempo - Cristiana
1974 - Viento salvaje - Verónica Dínar
1972 - Hijos de Satanás
1969 - La señora Muerte - Marlene
1969 - Al fin a solas
1969 - Blue Demon contra las invasoras
1969 - Mujeres de medianoche - Mabel
1969 - El Crepúsculo de un dios
1969 - Las Infieles
1969 - The Big Cube - Queen Bee
1969 - Pacto diabólico
1969 - Las Luchadoras contra el robot asesino - Gaby
1968 - Las de oros
1968 - Los Asesinos - Angela Nelson
1968 - The Chinese Room - Sidonia Campos
1968 - Bajo el imperio del hampa'''
1968 - Los Canallas'1967 - Dos pintores pintorescos - Diana
1967 - El Asesino se embarca - Paula
1967 - Pistoleros de la frontera1967 - Rocambole contra las mujeres arpías1967 - Adios cuñado1966 - Jinetes de la llanura1966 - El Rata1966 - El Temerario1966 - Solo de noche vienes1966 - Nosotros los jóvenes1966 - Despedida de soltera'' - Pilar

References

External links

Chespirito actors
Mexican film actresses
Mexican telenovela actresses
Mexican television actresses
Mexican women comedians
Actresses from Mexico City
1944 births
Living people